Keith Ross Lowen (born 14 July 1974) is a former New Zealand rugby union player. A second five-eighth, Lowen represented Waikato at a provincial level for most of his career, and was a member of the New Zealand national side, the All Blacks, in 2002. He played one international for the All Blacks against England. Lowen scored a hat-trick for the Chiefs against the Blues in a Super 12 match in 2001.

References

1974 births
Living people
Bay of Plenty rugby union players
Blues (Super Rugby) players
Cheetahs (rugby union) players
Chiefs (rugby union) players
Expatriate rugby union players in Japan
Expatriate rugby union players in South Africa
Green Rockets Tokatsu players
New Zealand expatriate rugby union players
New Zealand expatriate sportspeople in Japan
New Zealand expatriate sportspeople in South Africa
New Zealand international rugby union players
New Zealand sportspeople of Samoan descent
New Zealand rugby union players
People educated at St Peter's School, Cambridge
Rugby union centres
Rugby union players from Huntly, New Zealand
Waikato rugby union players